Karabin is the fourth studio album by Polish singer Maria Peszek, released in 2016 by Warner Music Poland. The singer co-wrote and co-produced the material with Michał "Fox" Król. The album explored such topics as freedom, individualism and hate speech. Although it did not match the critical success of its predecessors, having met with mixed reviews, it went gold in Poland in just over a month and eventually was certified platinum. To promote the album, Peszek performed concerts in Poland, Ireland, England and Czech Republic.

Track listing 
 "Gwiazda" – 3:37 ("Star")
 "Krew na ulicach" – 3:48 ("Blood on the Streets")
 "Elektryk" – 3:18 ("Electrician")
 "Żołnierzyk" – 4:36 ("Little Soldier")
 "Tu i teraz" – 3:37 ("Here and Now")
 "Jak pistolet" – 3:35 ("Like a Gun")
 "Polska A B C i D" – 4:01 ("Poland A, B, C and D")
 "Samotny tata" – 3:48 ("Lonely Dad")
 "Ogień" – 3:33 ("Fire")
 "Modern Holocaust" – 3:49 
 "Ej Maria" – 3:28 ("Hey, Mary")

Singles 
 2016: "Polska A B C i D"
 2016: "Modern Holocaust"
 2016: "Samotny tata"
 2016: "Ej Maria"

Chart positions

References

External links 
 Official audio stream on YouTube
 The official Maria Peszek website

2016 albums
Maria Peszek albums
Polish-language albums